Samantha King (born March 27, 1985) is a Canadian singer, songwriter, performer and recording artist who has performed throughout North America and the Caribbean.

Early life

King was the second child born to Wendy Woods and Phillip King. She has one older sister and one younger brother. She was born at the Royal Alexandra Hospital, Edmonton. She lived in Edmonton until age 11. After her parents’ separation she moved to Bruce, Alberta, with her mother and brother. 

In 1998, at age 13, she was the youngest person to win the Country Vocal Spotlight at the Canadian Finals Rodeo in Edmonton, Alberta.

Music career
King wrote her first song, "I’m Just So Blue", for her brother when she was 13, and released her first album, this is Forever, in December 2003.

At the age of 16, Samantha was a featured performer in the 2001 World Championship ceremonies in Edmonton for the theme song "We've Got the Fire" by Jan Randall.

She was then given the opportunity by RCA Nashville to work with The Mavericks lead singer, Raul Malo. She has also worked with Randy Bachman (Bachman–Turner Overdrive) and Buddy Cannon (Kenny Chesney’s Producer).

As an entertainer she’s performed on festival main stages with Tim McGraw, Alan Jackson, Jann Arden, Sawyer Brown, The Oak Ridge Boys, Joe Nichols, Duane Steele, George Fox, Doc Walker, Charlie Major, Colin James, Honeymoon Suite and many more.

She has written songs with several of Nashville’s well-known songwriters including Lisa Brokop (Artist), Tim Taylor (Jason McCoy), LuAnn Reid (Kenny Chesney), Eddie Schwartz (Hit Me with Your Best Shot), Ted Hewitt (Curb Music Producer), Joie Scott (Shania Twain) and many more.

In 2009, the day before she was to perform on the main stage at the Big Valley Jamboree in Camrose, Alberta, there was a large windstorm that collapsed the main stage - and caused the remainder of the four-day concert to be cancelled. As a make-up concert, King opened for Tim McGraw on September 17, 2009, at Rexall Place in Edmonton, Alberta, singing a brand-new song entitled "Let It Rain". Funds raised were donated to the Donna Moore fund providing for the family of the woman who died in the stage collapse.

Awards and nominations
King's accomplishments include:
‘Country Vocal Spotlight’ winner at the 1998 Canadian Finals Rodeo (at age 13)
Juno Award Nominee
2006 Canadian Country Music Association (CCMA) nomination for Female Artist of the Year
Two-time CCMA Chevy Truck Rising Star Nominee
Western Canadian Music Association (WCMA) nominee
Canadian Music Broadcasters Nominee for her single ‘The All Overs’
Won the grand prize in session one of the 2006 John Lennon Songwriting Contest (JLSC), in the category of best country song (along with co-songwriter Ted Hewitt). She was the only Canadian winner in the 12 genre categories.

Charities and fundraising
King is involved in a number of charities, and frequently performs benefit concerts for a variety of causes, including:
World Vision - she's been a World Vision Artist supporter since 2006
Michael Cuccione Children's Health Foundation (which helps fundraise for the Alberta's Stollery Children's Hospital Foundation) - She has been an advocate and supporter of this organization since 2000
Pilgrims Hospice Society Edmonton

References

External links
 Official website
 Bruce and Julie's Biography of Samantha
 Canadian Association for the Advancement of Music & the Arts (CAAMA)

1985 births
Living people
Canadian women country singers
Edmonton Oilers
Musicians from Edmonton
People from Beaver County, Alberta
21st-century Canadian women singers